Cloud 9 is a 2006 American direct-to-DVD sports comedy film starring Burt Reynolds that was written and produced by Brett Hudson, Burt Kearns and Albert S. Ruddy. It was the last comedy in which Reynolds reprised and updated his role as the charming rascal made legendary in films like The Longest Yard and Smokey and the Bandit.

The film was never released to cinemas; instead, it went straight to DVD by 20th Century Fox Home Entertainment on January 3, 2006, and distributed on DVD around the world in territories including India, Japan, Poland, Brazil, Greece and Thailand.

Plot
Reynolds plays a down and out sports promoter living in a trailer in Malibu, California, who turns his luck around after he has the brainstorm of starting up a beach volleyball team composed of strippers.

Cast

Production

D.L. Hughley and  Paul Wesley both spoke of Burt Reynolds' generosity. Wesley said Reynolds invited him to his home for dinner to listen to acting legends swap stories.

Reception

Scott Weinberg of DVDTalk.com wrote: "Cloud 9 is every bit as atrocious as its DVD case plainly implies. Worse than that, actually."

References

Sources
 Cloud 9 at IMDb
 Cloud 9 Oscar connections
 "Cloud 9 nails immigration issue"
 Qwipster's review of Cloud 9
 Photo gallery of Cloud 9 releases around the world
 Cloud 9 movie trailer
 Making of Cloud 9 DVD featurette: "Burt Reynolds Fight Club: "Directing A Rumble"
 Editing Cloud 9
 On Cloud 9: A conversation with Brett Hudson & Burt Kearns

2006 films
2006 direct-to-video films
American direct-to-video films
American sports comedy films
2000s sports comedy films
Volleyball films
Beach volleyball
20th Century Fox direct-to-video films
2006 comedy films
Films directed by Harry Basil
2000s English-language films
2000s American films